Chris Vermeulen (born 19 June 1982) is a retired Australian motorcycle racer who last competed in the World Superbike Championship for the works Kawasaki team, perhaps best-known for winning the 2007 French Grand Prix in MotoGP.

Vermeulen was born in Brisbane. He first raced in the Superbike class in 2004 and 2005 for the Ten Kate Honda team, finishing as series runner-up in 2005. He also won the World Supersport Championship for Ten Kate in 2003.

From 2006 season he joined the elite MotoGP series, for the Rizla Suzuki MotoGP Team. On 28 August 2009 Suzuki confirmed Vermeulen will leave the team at the end of the 2009 season. During his career, Vermeulen was regarded as a wet-weather expert and is affectionately nicknamed 'Vermin' on account of his last name.

Career

Early career
In 1999 he raced in the Australian Superbike Championship, despite only having participated in a handful of professional races beforehand. He took his Yamaha to 8th in the championship, with a best result of 4th, and the privateer championship for non-factory riders. His mentor Barry Sheene then arranged rides for him in Britain in their Supersport and Superstock classes, and success in these gave him his World Supersport break with Castrol Honda.

Initial success in a few late-2000 races did not translate into a successful 2001, as he only managed a single top 5 finish. However, in 2002 he linked up with Dutch team owner Gerrit Ten Kate, taking his first poles and podiums en route to 7th in the championship in the 2002 season. He became the team's lead rider for 2003, and became series champion comfortably with four victories, becoming the youngest ever winner.

Superbike World Championship
When Ten Kate arranged a deal to run a Honda Fireblade in World Superbikes for 2004, Chris was the natural choice to ride it. The team did their own development on the bike (in its first test they still used a road-bike clutch), but he still won four races and briefly led the championship before finishing 4th, as the only non-Ducati in the top 8.

For 2005 the championship had many Yamaha and Suzuki bikes, as well as 4 more Hondas including a second Ten Kate entry for Karl Muggeridge. Chris continued to record victories, and took his first pole at Assen in the Netherlands, the country in which his grandfather was born. Victory in the first race at Imola took him to within 55 points of veteran compatriot Troy Corser's lead, but the cancellation of the second race due to heavy rain meant that only 50 points were still available from the remaining round's 2 races. He still comfortably finished as series runner-up.

MotoGP World Championship
He rode factory bikes for Honda in the Suzuka 8 Hours race and, because of sponsorship and manufacturer relationships (Japan Tobacco and Honda, as the Ten Kate Honda team was sponsored by Winston a Japan Tobacco brand), also rode a Camel Pons Honda GP bike at the tail end of the 2005 season.

His progress towards a factory Honda ride seemed assured but Honda were only offering him another year in World Superbike, and Japan Tobacco had switched to Yamaha in MotoGP, so he made the bold decision to quit HRC and go with team Suzuki who signed him in 2006 alongside fellow youngster John Hopkins.

2006

He scored his first MotoGP pole in Turkey after a stunning ride in the wet, coincidentally one round after fellow Australian rookie Casey Stoner scored his maiden pole. After the Sachsenring race he was 14th in the championship on 46 points, 4 places and eighteen points behind Hopkins. At the following round at Laguna Seca, Vermeulen took pole position, one of only two non-Americans in the first two rows of the grid. Vermeulen was one of the few riders to have experience of the circuit, due to it being a former circuit of World Superbikes, and was holding its first Grand Prix race since 1993. He had a technical problem while running third. In his home race at Philip Island he was the fastest man once the field had changed to wet tyres, and charged through the field to finish 2nd.

2007
The 2007 season saw the introduction of the 800cc GP bikes. Vermeulen made the transition well, achieving a modestly competitive start to his 2007 campaign, with two 7th places, a 9th and an 11th place in the first 4 GPs of the season, consistently racking up points which saw him place inside the top 10 riders for the season. His season came alive on 20 May 2007 at the Bugatti Circuit Le Mans, where, in a wet race, Vermuelen rode from 12th on the grid to take his maiden victory in MotoGP. He followed the victory up with an impressive 3rd place at the British GP, again from 12th on the grid in the wet behind winner and fellow countryman Casey Stoner, and pole position in the wet at Assen. He shone in the dry by starting third and finishing second at the US GP (Mazda Raceway Laguna Seca), again behind Stoner. At this meeting he was confirmed as a Suzuki rider for 2008.

2008
Suzuki struggled to compete in the 2008 MotoGP Championship, with neither Vermeulen or teammate Loris Capirossi able to secure a race victory. Vermeulen did however secure back-to-back podiums in the German Grand Prix and US Grand Prix before finishing the season in eighth place in the rider's standings.

2009
Although Vermeulen finished every race in 2009, he took just one top-five finish and was generally outpaced by Capirossi. After another difficult season, Vermeulen was told by Suzuki that he would not be offered a new contract for 2010. Álvaro Bautista took his place in the team.

Return to Superbike
After failing to secure a contract to remain in MotoGP for the 2010 Championship, Vermeulen sought a return to the Superbike World Championship.

On 6 October 2009 it was confirmed that he had signed a contract with the Kawasaki Superbike Team for the 2010 Superbike World Championship season, replacing Makoto Tamada. Vermeulen injured his knee in a crash at the season-opening round at Phillip Island, forcing him to miss the next two races. He continued to struggle throughout the season, and reinjured the knee in a first-lap pile-up at Brno. Following medical advice, he then chose to sit out the remainder of the season in order to regain full fitness.

Personal life
In 2011, Vermeulen married his longtime girlfriend, the English model turned photographer Toni Pinion. All his racing numbers have the digit "7" as a tribute to his mentor Barry Sheene. He has a penchant for collecting old American Hot Rod cars and has a few in his collection.

Career statistics

Superbike World Championship

Races by year
(key) (Races in bold indicate pole position, races in italics indicate fastest lap)

Grand Prix motorcycle racing

By season

By class

Races by year
(key) (Races in bold indicate pole position, races in italics indicate fastest lap)

References

External links

 Chris Vermeulen – MotoGP Rider Bios at Motorcycle-USA

1982 births
Living people
Sportsmen from Queensland
Motorcycle racers from Brisbane
Suzuki MotoGP riders
Superbike World Championship riders
Supersport World Championship riders
Australian people of Dutch descent
FIM Superstock 1000 Cup riders
MotoGP World Championship riders
Australian motorcycle racers
21st-century Australian people